Daughter of Time is the fourth album by English jazz rock band Colosseum, released in 1970. The album remained for five weeks in the UK Albums Chart peaking number 23. Recorded in the midst of an upheaval in the band's lineup, only one of its eight tracks, "Three Score and Ten, Amen", features all six of the official band members.

Reception

Mike DeGagne gave the album a rave retrospective review in Allmusic, chiefly praising the wide variety of instruments used, but also acknowledging the melancholy tones and sense of drama. His only criticism was that the songs are too short, "all around six minutes in length" (in fact, only three of the songs are around six minutes in length, and half of them are much shorter).

Track listing

Personnel
 Chris Farlowe – lead vocals (tracks 1, 2, 4, 5, 7)
 Dick Heckstall-Smith – soprano and tenor saxophones; spoken word (track 1)
 Dave "Clem" Clempson – guitar; lead vocals (track 3)
 Dave Greenslade – organ, piano, vibes, backing vocals
 Mark Clarke – bass guitar (tracks 1, 5, 7)
 Jon Hiseman – drums, percussion

Additional Personnel
Barbara Thompson – flute, alto, soprano, tenor, and baritone saxophones, backing vocals (tracks 1-4)
Louis Cennamo – bass guitar (tracks 2-4, 6)

References

Colosseum (band) albums
1970 albums
Albums produced by Gerry Bron
Vertigo Records albums
Dunhill Records albums
Bronze Records albums